Bathyprion danae, the fangtooth smooth-head, is a species of slickhead found in deep waters of the Atlantic and Pacific Oceans.  It is in the monotypic genus Bathyprion.

Environment
Bathyprion danae is recorded to be found in a marine environment within bathypelagic depth range of about 100 – 3200 meters. They are considered to be a species found in the deep-waters.

Distribution
Bathyprion danae is native to the areas of the Eastern Atlantic, Namibia, the North Atlantic, and the western Pacific. It has been found isolated in the area of Madeira. This species has also been recorded to occupy the areas of the European waters, the North West Atlantic, the Portuguese Exclusive Economic Zone, and the Spanish Exclusive Economic Zone.

Common names
The common names of Bathyprion danae in various languages include the following:
Fangtooth smooth-head :  English
Fangtooth smoothhead : English
深海鋸平頭魚 : Mandarin Chinese
深海锯平头鱼 : Mandarin Chinese

Classification
The taxonomic classification of Bathyprion danae is as follows:
Kingdom : Animalia
 Phylum : Chordata
Subphylum : Vertebrata
Superclass : Gnathostomata
Class : Actinopterygii
Order : Osmeriformes
Family : Alepocephalidae
Genus : Bathyprion
Species : Bathyprion danae

Size
Bathyprion danae grows to a length of  SL.

Identification
Bathyprion danae can be identified by its slender body and its long, pointed snout. Its upper jaw is longer than its bottom jaw, and it reaches out longer than its eye. The scales of this species are colorful and there are numerous small scales on its body. Its body has a brownish color to it.

References

Notes
 

Alepocephalidae
Fish of the Pacific Ocean
Fish of the Atlantic Ocean

Fish described in 1966
Deep sea fish